is a Japanese tarento, actress, reporter, presenter-MC, radio personality, and former gravure idol. She graduated from Yukitani High School. She is represented with Production No Title.

Filmography

Television

TV dramas

Films

Anime films

Radio

Stage

Advertisements

Works

Photo albums

DVD

Bibliography

Serialisations

Books

References

External links
 – Production No Title 
 – Ameba Blog 

Japanese television personalities
Japanese musical theatre actresses
Japanese television presenters
Japanese radio personalities
Japanese gravure idols
Japanese cheerleaders
Singers from Tokyo
1987 births
Living people
Japanese women television presenters